Braunsapis picitarsis is a species of bee belonging to the family Apidae subfamily Apinae.

References

External links
 Animaldiversity.org
 Itis.gov
 Uniprot.org
 Academia.org

Xylocopinae
Insects of Sri Lanka
Insects described in 1902